Joseph Henry Cook (November 11, 1829 – March 7, 1921) was a merchant and political figure in Nova Scotia, Canada. He represented Queen's County in the Nova Scotia House of Assembly from 1882 to 1890 as a Liberal member.

He was born in Guysborough County, Nova Scotia, the son of Benjamin Cook and Lucy Maria Cameron, and was educated in Queens County. Cook was a justice of the peace, a member of the county council and a captain in the militia. He married Sophia Freeman in 1853. He died in Milton, Nova Scotia.

References 
The Canadian parliamentary companion, 1883 JA Gemmill
 A Directory of the Members of the Legislative Assembly of Nova Scotia, 1758-1958, Public Archives of Nova Scotia (1958)

1829 births
1921 deaths
Nova Scotia Liberal Party MLAs